The Studstrup Power Station is a thermal power station at Studstrup, Denmark. It is operated by Ørsted. It has an electrical generation capacity of 700 MWe and went in service in 1968. Waste heat from the plant is directed via pipes into Århus and used for district heating. In 2016, the power station was converted from a coal-fueled station to using biomass as their primary fuel.

It is located in Aarhus Municipality.

History 
The plant was built as a coal-fired power plant with a single unit with a nameplate capacity of  152 MWe electricity. It was inaugurated 18 October 1968 by Margrethe II. The plant was owned by I/S Midtkraft.

In 1972 unit 2 with a nameplate capacity of 262 MWe electricity was commissioned.

Two new coal-fired units, unit 3 and 4 was commissioned in 1984 and 1985. Both of them are combined heat and power plants each with a nameplate capacity of 380 MWe electricity and 455 MJ/s heat.

In 2000 I/S Midtkraft, five other power plant companies and the distribution company ELSAM I/S combined into Elsam A/S. In 2006 Elsam A/S was taken over by DONG Energy.

Unit 4 was expanded to burn straw as a supplement to coal in 2001. Unit 3 followed with the same conversion in 2005.

Between 2014 and 2016, unit 3 was converted from coal and straw to wood pellets. A new silo with a capacity of 65000 tons wood pellets and 800m conveyor system was constructed. Unit 3 can still be fired on coal, but due to taxes, it is only profitable to do when there is no demand for heat.

Unit 4 was decommissioned in April 2022, but in October 2022 the decommission was postponed to summer 2024 due the energy crisis in Europe.

From 22 September until 20 October 2022, a fire was active in the large silo containing wood pellets. It sent up large plumes of smoke. Nearby towns had at times to be evacuated while the firefighting was ongoing. The silo contained 55000 tons wood pellets when the fire broke out.

References

See also 

 List of power stations in Denmark

External links 
Studstrup Power Station

Energy infrastructure completed in 1968
Towers completed in 1968
Coal-fired power stations in Denmark
Oil-fired power stations in Denmark
Biomass power stations in Denmark
Cogeneration power stations in Denmark
Ørsted (company)